S. C. "Sam" Gwynne is an American writer. He holds a bachelor's degree in history from Princeton University and a master's degree in writing from Johns Hopkins University.

Life and career

Gwynne was born in Worcester, Massachusetts and grew up mainly in New Canaan, Connecticut. He attended secondary school at The Hill School. He majored in history at Princeton University and graduated in 1974. He also has a master's degree in writing from Johns Hopkins University, where he was awarded a graduate fellowship and studied under novelist John Barth. He lives in Austin, Texas with his wife, the artist Katie Maratta.

Prior to his career as a journalist and historian, Gwynne was a French teacher at Gilman School in Baltimore, Maryland. He was an international banker with both Ameritrust in Cleveland, Ohio and First Interstate Bank in Los Angeles and traveled extensively overseas.

He worked for Time magazine as a correspondent, bureau chief, and senior editor. He was later Executive Editor at Texas Monthly.  His journalism has appeared in the New York Times, Harper's, Los Angeles Times, Outside Magazine, Dallas Morning News, California Magazine, and the Wall Street Journal, among others. His New York Times Bestseller Empire of the Summer Moon (2010) was a finalist for the Pulitzer Prize in the General Nonfiction category and a finalist for the National Book Critics Circle Award. His book "Rebel Yell," a biography of Stonewall Jackson — also a New York Times Bestseller — was a finalist for the PEN Award for Literary Biography and for the National Book Critics Circle Award in history. He is also the author of The Perfect Pass: American Genius and the Reinvention of Football (2016), and, most recently, Hymns of the Republic: the Story of The Final Year of the American Civil War (2019).

Works

Selling Money, Weidenfeld & Nicolson, 1986, .
 The Outlaw Bank: A Wild Ride into the Secret Heart of BCCI, Random House, 1993
Empire of the Summer Moon: Quanah Parker and the Rise and Fall of the Comanches, the Most Powerful Tribe in American History, Scribner,  2010, .

 The Perfect Pass: American Genius and the Reinvention of Football, Scribner, 2016, 
 Hymns of the Republic: The Story of the Final Year of the American Civil War, Scribner, 2019,

Awards

 Gerald Loeb Award for Magazines for a series of articles on the BCCI scandal
Jack Anderson Award For Best Investigative Reporting
National Headliners Club Award for Reporting
Oklahoma Book Award
Texas Book Award
John Hancock award for Excellence in Financial Reporting
National City and Regional Magazine Award for Writer of the Year
Selected for "Best American Crime Writing" 2006

References

External links

http://www.scgwynne.com/
http://www.historynet.com/interview-with-author-s-c-gwynne.htm

Living people
Time (magazine) people
People from Austin, Texas
American male writers
The Hill School alumni
Princeton University alumni
Gerald Loeb Award winners for Magazines
Year of birth missing (living people)